The Hauran Druze Rebellion was a violent Druze uprising against Ottoman authority in the Syrian province, which erupted in 1909. The rebellion was led by the al-Atrash family, in an aim to gain independence, but ended in brutal suppression of the Druze, significant depopulation of the Hauran region and execution of the Druze leaders.

Background

The Hauran is a volcanic plateau, located in southwestern Syria and extending into the northwestern corner of modern-day Jordan. The area includes the Golan Heights on the west, and is bounded there by the Jordan Rift Valley; it also includes Jabal ad-Duruz area in the east, and is bounded there by more arid steppe and desert terrains.

With the advent of the Ottoman Turks and the conquest of Syria by Sultan Selim I in 1516, the Druze Ma'ans were acknowledged by the new rulers as the feudal lords of southern mount Lebanon. Druze villages spread and prospered in that region, which under Ma'an leadership so flourished that it acquired the generic term of Jabal Bayt-Ma'an (the mountain of the Ma'an family) or Jabal al-Druze. The latter title has since been usurped by the Hauran region, which since the middle of the 19th century has proven a haven of refuge to Druze emigrants from Mount Lebanon, and has become the headquarters of Druze power  The Druze family of Al-Atrash had nominally governed the region of Suwayda since 1879. Following the Young Turk Revolution of 1908, the spread of taxation, elections and conscription, to areas already undergoing economic change caused by the construction of new railroads, provoked large revolts, particularly among the Druzes of the Hauran.

Rebellion

The rebellion in Hauran erupted in May 1909, when a business dispute between Druze chief Yahia bey Atrash in the village of Busra al-Harir escalated into a clash of arms between the Druze and Ottoman-backed local villagers. A year of truce attempts followed, but failed to achieve any stability in the area and prompting an Ottoman response.

Sami Pasha al-Farouqi arrived in Damascus in August 1910, leading an Ottoman expeditionary force of some 35 battalions, and began advancing on Druze positions on 18 or 19 September. the first battle took place on 1-2 October, where the Druze were compelled to retreat. A second battle was fought on 12 October, where the government won another victory. By 8 November, the rebellion had disintegrated.

Sami Pasha al-Farouqi arrived in Damascus in August 1910, leading an Ottoman expeditionary force of some 35 battalions, Though the Druze recognized their inferiority against such a force, several clashes followed. Zuqan al-Atrash led a fierce battle against the Ottomans near al-Kafr, where he faced the forces of Sami Pasha al-Farouqi. After engaging Ottoman troops in two villages the Druze resistance collapsed.  

Sami Pasha used military force and trickery and succeeded in occupying the whole Jabal el-Druze. The rebellion ended with massive casualties among the Druze inhabitants of the Hauran, reaching as much as 10% of the population. The number of killed is put at 2,000 with a similar number of wounded and hundreds of imprisoned, taken into custody in Damascus and Acre. This led to significant depopulation of entire areas within the region. Zuqan, the leader of the revolt, was captured and later executed in 1911 (some sources place his execution in 1910).

Aftermath

Following the collapse of the Druze revolt, al-Farouqi launched a campaign to disarm the Druze population - some 10,000 rifles were collected. Al-Farouqi also performed a census of the Hauran area, ordering 200,000 cards from Istanbul for the purpose. Taxes were collected and arrears in cattle extracted when taxation was not available. Furthermore, one thousand Druze were conscripted into the Ottoman army and scattered throughout the empire. The Druze campaign of 1910 became a starting point to cancel a "policy of exceptions" in Ottoman Syria, later implementing similar measures in Jabal Ajlun, as well as during the Karak revolt in Transjordan.

During the First World War, the Ottomans left Jabal al-Druze in peace as they feared rebellion. Sultan al-Atrash, son of Zuqan al-Atrash, was then able to get in touch with Pan-Arab movements and especially with the Arab Revolt in Hijaz. When Arab forces reached Aqaba, he sent a thousand men to join the revolt. He joined them himself with another 300 men, when they reached Bosra. His forces were the first to enter Damascus and raise the Arab flag on the government house on September 29, 1918.
Sultan al-Atrash was in good relations with the Hashemite Emir Faisal, leader of the Arab forces in the revolt. Sultan was awarded the title of Emir and the rank of a General in the Syrian army, the equivalent of the title of Pasha.

In 1920, al-Atrash family was supporting the short-living Arab Kingdom of Syria, which was re-occupied by France after the Battle of Maysalun on July 24, 1920. Sultan al-Atrash was gathering his men to fight the French, but the quick succession of events cut his efforts short, as French forces entered Damascus and the country was divided into five states, State of Souaida (later Jabal al-Druze state) being one of them. Sultan al-Atrash would later become the rebel commander of the Druze War against the French Mandate between 1925 and 1927, and would remain a prominent figure in Syrian politics, despite the utter defeat of the Druze War.

See also
1860 Druze–Maronite conflict
Adana massacre
Franco-Syrian War

References

Conflicts in 1909
Rebellions against the Ottoman Empire
Rebellions in Ottoman Syria
1909 in Ottoman Syria
1909 in the Ottoman Empire
Demographics of the Ottoman Empire
Druze in the Ottoman Empire